Bowling at the 2015 Southeast Asian Games were held in Orchid Country Club, Singapore from 9 to 14 June 2015. Ten competitions were held in men's and women's singles, men's and women's doubles, men's and women's trios, men's and women's teams of five, and men's and women's masters.

Participating nations
A total of 75 athletes from seven nations are competing in bowling at the 2015 Southeast Asian Games:

Competition schedule
The following is the competition schedule for the bowling competitions:

Medal table

Medalists

Men

Note:Score for 2nd/3rd place.

Women

Note: 
 Cherie Tan of Singapore finished in third place, however, the bronze medal was awarded to Esther Cheah of Malaysia as no country is allowed to win all three medals on offer.
 Shayna Ng of Singapore was ranked 2nd in qualification and qualified for stepladder finals, but was defeated by countrywoman Daphne Tan in the 2nd/3rd Place match. With Singapore bowlers finishing in top five positions in qualification, Tannya Roumimper of Indonesia, ranked 6th in qualification, was eventually awarded the bronze medal as no country is allowed to win all three medals on offer.

References

External links
 

2015
Southeast Asian Games
2015 Southeast Asian Games events